Gymnachirus is a genus of American soles native to the Atlantic coast of the Americas.

Species
The currently recognized species in this genus are:
 Gymnachirus melas Nichols, 1916 (North American naked sole)
 Gymnachirus nudus Kaup, 1858 (naked sole)
 Gymnachirus texae (Gunter, 1936) (Gulf of Mexico fringed sole)

References

Achiridae
Marine fish genera
Taxa named by Johann Jakob Kaup